"Street Beat" is a song by Toni Basil, released in 1983 as the first single from her self-titled second album Toni Basil. Without a music video, the single failed to chart on the Billboard Hot 100, but it did peak at No. 63 on the Hot Dance Club Play chart.

References

Toni Basil songs
1983 singles
Song recordings produced by Mike Chapman
Songs written by Allee Willis
Songs written by Bruce Roberts (singer)
1983 songs
A&M Records singles